The Wuikinuxv , ("Backbone people"), also rendered Oweekano (Pre-1976); Oowekeeno  (1976-2003) (variation: Oweekeno, Owekano, Oweekayno, Wuikenukv, Wikeno, Owikeno, Awikenox, and also known as the Rivers Inlet people,  are an Indigenous First Nations people of the Central Coast region of the Canadian province of British Columbia, located around Rivers Inlet and Owikeno Lake, to the north of Queen Charlotte Strait.  The Wuikinuxv people and their neighbours the Heiltsuk and Haisla peoples were in the past sometimes known incorrectly as the "Northern Kwakiutl".

History
The name used for the main village on Katit Indian Reserve No. 1, which is on an island in the Wannock River, that connects Owikeno Lake to Rivers Inlet, "Wannock", means "poison" and refers to an 1848 raid by the Heiltsuk, as recounted by John Thomas Walbran in his authoritative opus on coastal names in British Columbia:

Culture
A recently completed Bighouse, which is the first in many years, is the focus on a rebuilding of Wuikinuxv society.

The culture was structured much the same as the other indigenous peoples of the coast. At the height of the coastal civilization, Wuikinuxv territory encompassed the mouth of Rivers Inlet to the head waters of Owikeno Lake.

Ethnobotany
They use the berries of Vaccinium vitis-idaea ssp. minus as food.

Language

Oowekyala, the language of the Wuikinuxv, is closely related to the Heiltsuk language, so much so that it is considered one of two dialects of a language named Heiltsuk-Oowekyala, the other dialect being Heiltsuk.  It is also closely related to Haisla and is also related to Kwak'wala, the most widely spoken of the Northern Wakashan languages.  It is more distantly related to Nuu-chah-nulth, Ditidaht and Makah, the Southern Wakashan languages.

Government
The government of the Wuikinuxv people is the Wuikinuxv Nation. The Wuikinuxv Nation is a member of the Wuikinuxv-Kitasoo-Nuxalk Tribal Council, based in the town of Bella Coola.

Location and services
At present the small community of Rivers Inlet which is situated on the banks of the 3 km Wannock River is the main centre in Wuikinuxv territory; adjacent to it is the non-Indian reserve First Nations community of Oweekeno.  It has an airstrip and daily service from a local airline. In the summer months, airline service is disrupted by the traffic in and out of the sport-fishing camps.

Notes

References
We Are the Wuikinuxv Nation: Wuikinuxv/Rivers Inlet, Pam Brown, Pacific Northwest Curator, Museum of Anthropology, University of British Columbia, 2001

External links
Wuikinuxv Nation webpage

 
Central Coast of British Columbia
First Nations in British Columbia